Atteva intermedia is a moth of the Attevidae family. It is endemic to Antigua.

This species is an intermediate between Atteva fulviguttata and Atteva gemmata, differing from the former by the presence of white dots on forewings and thorax and from the latter by the reduced number of these dots.

Etymology
It is named in reference to its pattern, intermediate between Atteva fulviguttata and Atteva gemmata.

External links
A review of the New World Atteva (Walker) moths (Yponomeutidae, Attevinae)

Attevidae
Moths described in 2009